The Latin America Region has competed in the Little League World Series since its creation in 1958. Until 2001, the Latin America Region included Mexico and the Caribbean. In 2001 – when the Little League World Series expanded to sixteen teams – Mexico and the Caribbean were given their own regions. The region is open to all countries on the Latin American mainland, but is typically contested by the teams from Panama and Venezuela. Since the 2001 split, the region has been represented by either Venezuela (11 appearances) or Panama (seven appearances) at the Little League World Series, as of 2019.

Following the 2021 LLWS, Panama and the Caribbean Region countries of Cuba and Puerto Rico will take up two berths in the LLWS. Two of the three will send champions to the LLWS each year, while the third will compete in its normal region; the automatic berths will rotate annually. This scheme is part of a planned expansion of the LLWS from 16 to 20 teams that was originally scheduled to occur for 2021, but was delayed to 2022 due to COVID-19.

Teams from Latin America have won the LLWS title five times, but only four were as the Latin America Region champion. The Industrial Little League of Monterrey, Mexico, won back-to-back titles in 1957 and 1958, but the first title was as the champion of the South Region. The other three LLWS championships were won by Guadalupe, Nuevo León, Mexico, in 1997, and Maracaibo, Venezuela, in 1994 and 2000.

Latin America Region countries

Region champions

Summary
As of the 2022 Little League World Series

Italics indicates team no longer competes in Latin America Region. Mexico now has its own region, while Puerto Rico, Dominican Republic, and Curaçao compete in the Caribbean region.

See also

References

External links
 Little League Online

Latin America
Latin American baseball leagues
Recurring sporting events established in 1957